Godovikovite is a rare sulfate mineral with the chemical formula: (NH4)Al(SO4)2. Aluminium can partially be substituted by iron. Hydration of godovikovite gives the ammonium alum, tschermigite. The mineral forms cryptocrystalline, often porous, masses, usually of white colour. Single crystals are very small hexagonal blades. Typical environment for godovikovite are burning coal sites (mainly dumps). There the mineral acts, together with millosevichite, as one of the main components of so-called sulfate crust.

It was first described in 1988 for an occurrence in the Chelyabinsk coal basin, Chelyabinsk Oblast, Southern Urals, Russia, and named for Russian mineralogist Aleksandrovich Godovikov (1927–1995).

References

 Webmineral

Sulfate minerals
Trigonal minerals